Preciziei (eng. [of the] precision), formerly known as Industriilor is a terminus metro station in Bucharest. It is situated in the industrial park in the west of the city. Industrial facilities directly served by the metro station: Coca-Cola factory, Urbis. Other industrial facilities in the park can be reached by tram. The station is located on the Preciziei Avenue. This is the last stop on the M3 Line connecting Preciziei to Anghel Saligny.

The station was opened on 19 August 1983 as part of the extension from Eroilor.

References

Bucharest Metro stations
Railway stations opened in 1983
1983 establishments in Romania